Volo di notte (Night Flight) is a one-act opera composed by  Luigi Dallapiccola to an Italian libretto he wrote based on the novel Vol de nuit by Antoine de Saint-Exupéry.  It was first performed at the Teatro della Pergola in Florence on May 18, 1940.

The opera emphasizes individual suffering and was written as a response to the rise of fascism.

Roles

First employee (tenor)	
Second employee (baritone)	 
Third employee (tenor)	 
Fourth employee (baritone)	 
Leroux, a pilot (bass)	
Pellerin, a pilot (tenor)	
Radio operator (tenor)	 
Rivière, the airfield director (bass-baritone)	 
Robineau, an inspector (bass)	
Simona Fabien, wife of a pilot (mezzo-soprano)

Synopsis 

The subject is an individual aviator, an Argentine long-distance mail carrier, during the early days of flying.  He is caught in a storm, with no way to land. The ensuing drama occurs both within his family, anxious for his safe return, and among his employers, concerned both for his safe return and the success of their enterprise.

References 

Operas by Luigi Dallapiccola
Italian-language operas
1940 operas
Operas
One-act operas
Adaptations of works by Antoine de Saint-Exupéry
Operas based on novels
Aviation plays and operas